Sunset Rubdown Introducing Moonface is a two-song EP by Sunset Rubdown, which was released in April 2009. The two-song "picture disc" was recorded at Spencer Krug's house and mixed by Arlen Thompson and Krug at Breakglass Studio.

Track listing
 "Coming to at Dawn" - 4:08
 "Insane Love Is Awakening" - 3:30

References

External links
 Official web site

2006 EPs
Sunset Rubdown albums